Brachycybe (Greek for "short head") is a genus of andrognathid millipedes with species in the United States and East Asia. In a rare example of paternal care in invertebrates, males of most species guard the eggs until they hatch.

Description 
Brachycybe species are rather similar in appearance, varying in subtle features of the collum (first body segment) and paranota (lateral “keels” extending off of body segments). Individuals attain lengths up to 1 inch (25 mm) and range in color from orange to tan to pink. B. picta is uniquely patterned with 5 brown spots.  The 9th and 10th pair of legs in mature males are modified into gonopods (reproductive appendages), and although gonopods are widely used to determine species in millipedes, the relatively simple gonopods of Brachycbe and other members of the Platydesmida show little variation and are not readily useful for species identification.

Ecology 
While most millipedes feed on leaf litter or other plant matter, Brachycybe are thought to feed primarily on fungus, and may be found under rotting logs or stumps.

Egg brooding 
Male egg brooding (care of eggs) has been extensively studied in B. nodulosa, a species found in Japan and South Korea. After the
female lays eggs, the male coils his body around the mass, and guards them until hatching, a behavior thought to protect the eggs from soil-dwelling fungi or predators such as ants.

Species 

At least ten species have been named, and at least two undescribed species have been identified by genetic analysis. Studies of genetic differences suggest the genus originated in California around 50 million years ago.

 B. californica (Karsch, 1880) i c g 	
 B. cooki Loomis, 1942 - Jiangxi Province, China
 B. disticha Mikhaljova, Golovatch, Korsós, Chen & Chang, 2010 g - Taiwan
 B. lecontii Wood, 1864 i c g b - Southeastern United States, from Virginia to Illinois and Kansas, south to Louisiana and southern Alabama.
 B. nodulosa Verhoeff, 1935 - Central and Southern Japan, southern South Korea.
 B. petasata Loomis, 1936 i c g b - Southern Appalachians: in adjacent parts of North Carolina, Georgia, Alabama, and Tennessee.
 B. picta Gardner, 1975 i c g - Northern California: Marin County and Mendocino County.
 B. potterinus Chamberli, 1941 c g
 B. producta Loomis, 1936 i c g b - Northern California
 B. rosea Murray, 1877 i c g b - Northern California
Data sources: i = ITIS, c = Catalogue of Life, g = GBIF, b = Bugguide.net

References

Millipedes of North America
Millipedes of Asia
Platydesmida
Millipede genera